Alexis Mateo Pacheco (born July 24, 1979), best known as Alexis Mateo, is a Puerto Rican drag queen, performer, reality television personality, fashion designer, and the winner of All American Goddess 2016, Miss Gay Days 2016 and National Showgirl 2017. She became internationally known as a contestant on season 3 of RuPaul's Drag Race, and seasons one and five of RuPaul's Drag Race All Stars. Alexis Mateo is also drag mother of viral sensation and "RuGirl" Vanessa Vanjie Mateo.

Early life
Born in 1979, Alexis Mateo began her drag career in Puerto Rico's gay nightclub circuit before relocating in 2001 to Orlando, Florida, where she worked as a dancer and performer at Disney World. In addition to his drag career, which began in 2006, he is a fashion designer and has won the 2001 Inter Fashion Award for Best Fashion Designer.

Career 
While residing in Central Florida, he won many gay pageants including Miss Florida US of A, Miss Florida Latina, Miss Orlando, Miss Central Florida, Miss Lakeland, Miss Waterside, Miss Suncoast, Miss Suncoast America, Miss ASAP, Miss Lakeland America, Miss Orlando Latina, Miss Florida International and Sunshine State All American Goddess.

Mateo has been active in AIDS awareness and activism. After being featured in a Gilead Sciences ad titled "Red Ribbon Runway" with fellow Drag Race co-stars Manila Luzon, Delta Work, Shangela Laquifa Wadley and Carmen Carrera, the dress he was featured wearing was auctioned off by Logo in commemoration of World AIDS Day. Proceeds from the auction were donated to the National Association of People with AIDS. In 2012, along with other RuPaul's Drag Race contestants, Mateo appeared in the music video "Queen" by band Xelle (which featured former drag race contestant Mimi Imfurst as a member). She was one of thirty drag queens featured in Miley Cyrus's 2015 VMA performance.

RuPaul’s Drag Race

Mateo joined as a cast member on the third season of Logo's reality series, RuPaul's Drag Race, which premiered on the network on January 29, 2011. Mateo won three of the main challenges (Episodes 2, 3, and 8) before making it to the top three, where he was eliminated in the season finale which aired on April 25, 2011.

Mateo served as a guest professor on the third episode of the third season of Drag Race spin-off series RuPaul's Drag U. On August 6, 2012, it was announced that Mateo was one of twelve past Drag Race contestants selected to join the cast of RuPaul's Drag Race: All Stars that premiered on the Logo network on October 22, 2012. Teamed with contestant Yara Sofia to form Team Yarlexis, the duo was eliminated in the fourth episode of the series which aired on November 12, 2012.

Mateo made a guest appearance in the premiere episode of AJ and the Queen in 2020.

On May 8, 2020, Mateo was announced as one of the ten queens competing on the fifth season of RuPaul's Drag Race All Stars. Mateo was eliminated in episode 6, ultimately placing 5th. Her elimination came largely because of accusations from India Ferrah that Mateo had campaigned against eventual winner Shea Couleé. Mateo was vindicated in the series finale when Ferrah's claims were shown to be lies, and the contestants that voted Mateo out apologized.

In March, Alexis Mateo, alongside the rest of the RuPaul's Drag Race Live! cast, performed with Katy Perry during her Play concert residency at Resorts World Las Vegas.

Pageant Titles
Mateo has competed in many pageants and holds many titles. Including:
 Miss Lakeland 2004, winner
 Miss Gay Florida USofA 2006, winner
 Miss Gay Florida America 2007, 1st alternate
 Miss Gay Florida America 2008, 1st alternate
 Miss Orlando Latina 2009
 Miss Gay Florida International 2010, winner
 Miss Parliament House 2012, 1st alternate
 Miss Heart of Florida 2013, 1st alternate
 Miss Gay Georgia USofA 2013, 1st alternate
 Miss Tampa Bay International 2013, winner
 Sunshine State All American Goddess 2014, winner
 Miss Gay Southern States USofA 2014, winner
 Miss North Florida FI 2015, winner
 Miss Florida FI 2015, 1st alternate
 Miss Gay USofA 2015, 3rd alternate
 Miss Tampa Pride 2016, winner
 Miss Gay Days 2016, winner
 Kentucky All American Goddess 2016, winner
 All American Goddess 2016, winner
 National Showgirl 2017, winner

Mateo is also a former Miss Florida Latina, Miss Orlando, Miss Central Florida, Miss Waterside, Miss Suncoast, Miss Suncoast America, Miss Lakeland America and Miss ASAP.

Personal life
Mateo resides in Las Vegas, Nevada, where he performs at gay venues and events both locally and throughout the United States. In April 2011, Mateo along with fellow contestant Yara Sofia launched a boycott of a Tampa beauty supply shop after the two claimed they had been told to leave the store because of their sexual orientation. His drag daughter is season 10 and season 11 Drag Race contestant Vanessa Vanjie Mateo. On March 1, 2018, his Instagram account was hacked and deleted, forcing him to make a new one.

Discography

Singles

Featured singles

As Featured Artist

Filmography

Television

Web series

Music videos

References

External links 

Living people
American drag queens
Interamerican University of Puerto Rico alumni
Puerto Rican LGBT entertainers
People from Florida, Puerto Rico
Puerto Rican drag queens
Alexis Mateo
Alexis Mateo
1979 births
Hispanic and Latino American drag queens